Rosario DeSimone  (11 December 1873 – 15 July 1946) was the head of an Italian crime family during the 1920s to 1940s that was the predecessor to the Los Angeles crime family of the American Mafia. Rosario was the father of the future California mob boss, Frank DeSimone. He is not to be confused with the Chicago Italian Timothy Rosario DeSimone.

Biography

DeSimone was born in Salaparuta, Sicily, Italy, on 11 December 1873. He initially settled in New Orleans before moving to Pueblo, Colorado. In Pueblo he was part of that city's Mafia organization, and was evidently well-respected. He became a close ally of Vito Di Giorgio in Los Angeles. Upon Di Giorgio's death in Chicago in 1922, DeSimone took power. His empire spanned over Los Angeles County. His rule in Los Angeles was brief, and he stepped down around 1925. He later became a legitimate businessman who settled in Downey, California. DeSimone died of natural causes in 1946, and is buried in Calvary Cemetery.

Family
DeSimone married twice and fathered several children. Frank DeSimone, his second son, became a criminal attorney and later don of the crime family, reigning from 1956 to 1967.

References

Gentile, Nick, with Felice Chilanti.  Vita Di Capomafia.  Rome: Editori Riuniti, 1963.
Warner, Richard N. "The First Mafia Boss of Los Angeles? The Mystery of Vito Di Giorgio, 1880-1922." On The Spot Journal (Summer 2008), 46–54.
Los Angeles Times obituary for Rosario DeSimone, July 17, 1946

1873 births
1946 deaths
People from the Province of Trapani
Italian emigrants to the United States
American gangsters of Sicilian descent
American crime bosses
History of Los Angeles
Los Angeles crime family
Gangsters from Los Angeles
Prohibition-era gangsters
People from Downey, California